The Jacobikerk is a landmark Protestant church in Utrecht, Netherlands. The building is located on the St Jacobsstraat, named for its patron saint St. James the Greater. The church is one of the medieval parish churches of Utrecht, along with the Buurkerk, the Nicolaïkerk and the Geertekerk. Today it is known as the starting place for Dutch pilgrims on their way to Santiago de Compostella along the Way of St. James. The Dutch Confraternity of St. James is located around the corner on the St. Jacobskerkhof.

History
  
The current gothic church dates from the end of the 13th century, but was expanded in the 14th and 15th centuries. In 1576-1577 a cannon was installed in the church tower, aimed at Vredenburg (castle) where the Spanish soldiers there were under siege by the Utrecht schutters. Around 1580 the church endured the protestant reformation and in 1586 it was formally handed over to the protestants, who whitewashed the wall decorations and removed the altarpieces. 

The tower bell was made by S. Butendiic in 1479, with a diameter of 182 cm.

Church function
The church still accommodates weekly Sunday services, but is regularly rented out for other functions, including weddings and concerts, but also for various cultural initiatives of the city or the local university.

References

External links
Website Protestantse Wijkgemeente Jacobikerk (Dutch only)
Website Genootschap St. Jacob (Dutch only)

Churches in Utrecht (city)
Rijksmonuments in Utrecht (city)
Protestant churches in the Netherlands
Protestant churches converted from Roman Catholicism
13th-century churches in the Netherlands